2 Special Service Battalion (usually abbreviated to 2SSB) was an armoured regiment of the South African Army and only one of two such in its regular force. The Regiment was based at Zeerust. It was known in English as, 2 Special Service Battalion, and in the Afrikaans language as, 2 Spesiale Diens Bataljon (2 SSB and 2 SDB).

History
2 Special Service Battalion was founded on 1 May 1946 at Potchefstroom. The S.S.B. was a military unit formed to take in young men who were unable to find employment. Before World War II, the Special Service Battalion was reorganized into two battalions – 1st and 2nd Special Service Battalions. In 1946, the South African Armoured Corps was officially proclaimed and the Special Service Battalion was included in the corps as the only full-time unit and its symbols and colours were incorporated.

Infantry
Initially, the sole purpose of 2 SSB was to train members of the Permanent Force as infantrymen. 2 SSB was put into service officially on 21 February 1947 and on 26 January 1951, the name changed from 2 SSB to 1 South African Infantry Battalion (1 SAI). 2 SSB can thus be seen as the founding unit of the South African Infantry Corps.

Armour changeover
C-Squadron of 2 Armoured Car Regiment was founded during February 1962 with its official base at Zeerust. On 22 December 1966 the name was adapted to C-Squadron 1 SSB.

On 1 October 1973, 2 SSB, born from C-Squadron 1 SSB, was resettled. The headquarters of the regiment, as well as C-Squadron 1 SSB, was stationed at Zeerust, while D-Squadron 1 SSB was detached to 2 South African Infantry Battalion at Walvis Bay.

Border War
Several squadrons have taken part in the war in Namibia and Angola since 1974. From 8 October 1975 to 31 January 1976, B-, C- and D-Squadron took part in Operation Savannah. This border duty was continued with significant participations in Operation Protea, Daisy, Hooper and Modular.

On 25 January 1988, 2 SSB became the first unit in South Africa to receive the Right Of Free Admission to a coloured community, namely Henryville.

Bophuthatswana coup d'état

On 10 February 1988, 2 SSB took part in Operation Adding during which President Lucas Mangope and his government was returned to power, after a failed coup d’état.

Rooikat Conversion
In May 1990, 2 SSB received the first Rooikat armoured cars and on 30 June its national colours.

Corps Change ARMOUR to INFANTRY
On 31 December 1992, as part of the reduction of the SA Army after withdrawal from SWA- Namibia (Resolution 435), 2 SSB underwent a change in role. The unit was transformed from an armoured car regiment to a motorised infantry battalion and provided with an operational company (A-Company) which was transferred from Group 20.

During the 1994 South African general election, 2 SSB took part in Operation Baccarat, providing stability and border protection for Mmabatho and Passado as a peace force ensuring stability in the  North West province.

On 19 December 1994, the Bophuthatswana Defence Force Parachute Battalion at Gopane was placed under operational command of 2 SSB, as part of the founding of the SANDF. 2 SSB withdrew simultaneously from Nietverdiend and Nooitgedacht. From August 1994 to 15 June 1995, successful bridging training was provided for 550 formerly non-statutory force members.

Disbandment

Early in 1997, the rationalisation of the South African National Defence Force was announced and 2 SSB was one of the battalions that was disbanded. 2 SSB amalgamated with 10 SAI on 1 April 1997 in Mafikeng. 2 SSB was demobilized on 30 August 1997 after the base was transferred to 2 SAI Battalion.

Regimental symbols
The cap badge is a spray of three protea flowers, bound by a ribbon bearing the initials and motto.
Regimental honour roll : Soldiers who died during active combat duty and soldiers who died during training. See 2 SSB Roll of Honour

Dress Insignia

Honour Roll

 Baker, E. 1990
 Bridgeman, T.M. 1975
 Brink, C.M.1978
 Burger, W.J.1974
 Cronje, D.J. 1987
 De Lange, J.H. 1983
 De Lange, P.H. 1983
 Du Plessis, J.C. 1988
 Elsworthy, D.M. 1978
 Erasmus, E. 1988
 Eybers, P.G. 1975
 Hanekom, J.M. 1981
 Helm, H.C. 1985
 Jansen van Vuuren, F.H. 1984 
 Lecuona, M.J. 1988
 Meerholz, J.R. 1980
 Muller, A. 1976
 Muller, D.M. 1979
 Muller, P.J. 1982
 Naude, D. 1983
 Obbes, G.M.F. 1975
 Oberholzer, W. 1981
 Randall, J.A.S.T. 1984
 Schoeman G.F. 1975
 Scott, G. 1988
 Stassen, P.I.M. 1983
 Steyn, D.A. 1981
 Taljaard, J.J. 1975
 Truebody, H.C. 1978
 van Rooyen, G. 1988
 van Wyk, W.A. 1988
 Viljoen, M. 1987
 Volgraff, G. 1975
 Ziemkendorf, H. 1987

Alliances

Leadership

See also

South African Armoured Corps

Notes

References

External links
 SA Armour Museum
 SA Armour Association
 Exercise Seboka
 1 SSB Roll of Honour

Armoured regiments of South Africa
Military units and formations established in 1946
Military units and formations disestablished in 1997